Beverley Ann Busson  ( MacDonald; born August 23, 1951) is a Canadian Senator and former police officer who served as the 21st commissioner of the Royal Canadian Mounted Police (RCMP) from December 2006 to June 2007. She was the first woman to hold this position and was appointed on an interim basis in the wake of Giuliano Zaccardelli's resignation amid controversy. Busson's subsequent appointment as a member of the Senate of Canada representing British Columbia was announced on September 24, 2018.

Early life and police career 
Busson was born as Beverley Ann MacDonald on August 23, 1951, in Halifax, Nova Scotia. She joined the Royal Canadian Mounted Police in 1974 after graduating with an education degree. She would later earn a law degree from the University of British Columbia. 

Rising up the ranks, Busson has worked for the RCMP in Salmon Arm, Vancouver, Ottawa and North Battleford, Saskatchewan (Assistant Commissioner and Commanding Officer in Saskatchewan). Prior to her appointment she was Deputy Commissioner for the Pacific Region (2000–2006) and took a leave from the force to head British Columbia's Organized Crime Agency (1999–2000).

Senate of Canada 
During debate on use of the Emergencies Act, in relation to the Freedom Convoy protests in Ottawa, Busson stated in Senate that Ottawa had become an "amusement park for anarchists." She urged the Act be kept in place, noting encampments near Ottawa, "so these people do not again overwhelm the people who are trying to protect us;" Prime Minister Justin Trudeau stopped use of the Act later that day.

Awards 
In 2004, she was made a Commander of the Order of Merit of the Police Forces. In 2006, she was made a Member of the Order of British Columbia.

On June 17, 2010, she was awarded the Doctor of Laws honorary degree by Simon Fraser University in Burnaby, British Columbia.

References

External links 
 RCMP biography
 Order of British Columbia citation
 Busson named interim RCMP commissioner

1951 births
Living people
Members of the Order of British Columbia
Members of the Order of Canada
People from Halifax, Nova Scotia
Royal Canadian Mounted Police commissioners
Peter A. Allard School of Law alumni
Canadian women police officers
Canadian senators from British Columbia
Independent Canadian senators
Women members of the Senate of Canada